Malus angustifolia, or southern crabapple, is a species of crabapple native to the eastern and south-central United States.

Description 
M. angustifolia is a tree sometimes attaining a height of 10 meters (33 feet). The flowers are pink, with a pleasant scent.

Taxonomy 
The following two varieties are known:
Malus angustifolia var. angustifolia
Malus angustifolia var. puberula  (Rehder) Rehder

Distribution and habitat 
The species can be found from Florida west to eastern Texas and north to New Jersey, Pennsylvania, Illinois and Missouri.

Ecology 
The fruits are eaten by various wildlife.

Uses 
Although the fruits are astringent, acidic, and unpalatable when raw, they can be used to make jellies, jams, and food preserves.

The tree is grown as an ornamental plant.

References

External links 
Carolina Nature
Lady Bird Johnson Wildflower Center, University of Texas
Louisiana Plant Identification
Leafsnap.com:  Images of the Southern Crabapple (Malus angustifolia) 

angustifolia
Crabapples
Flora of the Southeastern United States
Flora of the Northeastern United States
Flora of the North-Central United States
Flora of the Appalachian Mountains
Flora of Texas
Fruits originating in North America
Trees of the United States
Plants described in 1789